Anikó Meksz (born 18 June 1965, in Szekszárd) is a former Hungarian handball goalkeeper who competed in the 1996 Summer Olympics and won the bronze medal with the Hungarian team.

Achievements

Club
With Dunaferr NK
Magyar Kupa:
Finalist: 1994
EHF Cup Winners' Cup:
Winner: 1995

International
Olympic Games:
Bronze Medalist: 1996
World Championship:
Silver Medalist: 1995
7th: 1993
9th: 1999
European Championship:
4th: 1994
10th: 1996

References

External links 
 
 
 

1965 births
Living people
People from Szekszárd
Hungarian female handball players
Olympic handball players of Hungary
Handball players at the 1996 Summer Olympics
Olympic bronze medalists for Hungary
Olympic medalists in handball
Medalists at the 1996 Summer Olympics
Sportspeople from Tolna County